Agathariruppu is a village in Ramanathapuram district of the Indian state of Tamil Nadu. Agathariruppu falls under Abiramam town panchayat and Kamuthi Taluk.

Demography 
People from Agathariruppu are mostly settled outside for jobs and education. Overall resident population is less than 500.

Festival

Yearly Mariamman Thiruvizha 
Mariyamman Mulaipaari Festival celebrated annually, during this festival, the people settled in Chennai, Madurai and Ramanathapuram join together.

Bullock cart pilgrim trip 
People from Agathariruppu go for temple trip to M.Pudupatti/ Keela rajakula Raman rajapalayam near Sivakasi in Bullock cart, once in every four years (usually in May month), along with other people who belongs to Aarukarai Yadava community.

They travel for nearly 80 km in three days to worship Sri Ericheeswara Ponnirulappan Swami and Swami Koodamudaya Ayyanar and Kaali Amman

Notable people 
 Professor Chenna Pulavar Karmega Konar was born in this village.

References 

Villages in Ramanathapuram district